Chassenon is a commune in the Charente department in southwestern France.

History
The ancient name of the village was Cassinomagus.

Situated on the Agrippan Way (Lyon - Saintes), Cassinomagus was, in the Roman times, important enough to be mentioned on the mediaeval Peutinger map as one of the two secondary towns between Limoges and Saintes. The remains of this Gallo-Roman town lay on about 300 hectares and include a sanctuary of about 25 hectares. This sanctuary consisted of several monuments: a big temple, two small ones, a theatre (amphitheatre ?), and thermal baths. The baths, which are very well preserved, can be visited.

The impactite, which is part of the Rochechouart impact structure, was quarried north-west of Rochechouart near Chassenon, was the stone principally used in the building of the monumental Roman baths of Cassinomagus.

Population

See also
Communes of the Charente department
 Rochechouart crater

References

Communes of Charente
Lemovices
Charente communes articles needing translation from French Wikipedia